Hilarographa cladara is a species of moth of the family Tortricidae. It is found on Borneo.

The wingspan is about 10 mm. The forewings are purplish fuscous, the costal third slightly suffused with orange, becoming brighter golden orange towards the apex. The termen is orange with a golden gloss. The remainder of the wing is marbled and strigulated (finely streaked) by slightly suffused pale orange strigulae and spots. The hindwings are bronze fuscous, the apical third tinged deeper purple.

References

Moths described in 1977
Hilarographini